(plural) is a stork that gets injured by an arrow while wintering in Africa and returns to Europe with the arrow stuck in its body. As of 2003, about 25  have been documented in Germany.

The first and most famous  was a white stork found in 1822 near the German village of Klütz, in the state of Mecklenburg-Vorpommern. It was carrying a  spear from central Africa in its neck. The specimen was stuffed and can be seen today in the zoological collection of the University of Rostock.

This  was crucial in understanding the migration of European birds. Before migration was understood, people struggled to explain the sudden annual disappearance of birds like the white stork and barn swallow. Besides migration, some theories of the time held that they turned into other kinds of birds, mice, or hibernated underwater during the winter, and such theories were even propagated by zoologists of the time. The  in particular proved that birds migrate long distances to wintering grounds.

References

Further reading
 

Ornithology
Bird migration
Storks
1822 in science
German words and phrases